Tiruppur Kulipalayam railway station is a station in Tamil Nadu, India.

References

Salem railway division
Railway stations in Tiruppur district